"It's a Miracle" is a 2005 single by Swedish glam metal band Crashdïet. This was the last single to feature the band's original lead singer Dave Lepard. He died in January 2006. A music video was shot for the song. This song appears on the band's 2005 album, "Rest in Sleaze". The song did not chart.

Track listing
"It's a Miracle" - 3:28
"Out of Line" - 3:42

Personnel
Dave Lepard - vocals
Martin Sweet - Guitar
Peter London - Bass guitar
Eric Young - drums

References

External links
Official Crashdiet website

2005 singles
Songs written by Martin Sweet
Songs written by Dave Lepard
Crashdïet songs
2005 songs